James Joseph Seifert (born November 24, 1956) is an American politician in the state of Minnesota. He served in the Minnesota House of Representatives.

References

Republican Party members of the Minnesota House of Representatives
1956 births
Living people
People from Brown County, Minnesota
People from Woodbury, Minnesota
University of St. Thomas (Minnesota) alumni
University of Notre Dame alumni
Creighton University School of Law alumni
Minnesota lawyers